Linda Holeman (née Freeman) is a Canadian author of fiction. Born in Winnipeg, Manitoba, she earned a Bachelor of Arts from the University of Winnipeg, and a Bachelor and Master of Education from the University of Manitoba. She currently lives and writes in Toronto, Ontario.

Writing career 

Holeman is the author of fourteen books of fiction, which have sold millions of copies worldwide. Her work has been translated into twenty languages, and includes two adult collections of literary short stories, Flying to Yellow and Devil's Darning Needle, as well as the historical novels The Linnet Bird, The Moonlit Cage, In A Far Country, The Saffron Gate, The Lost Souls of Angelkov, and The Devil On Her Tongue. Her particular interest in writing historical fiction is demonstrating the plight of women in the 18th and 19th centuries, from the point of view of strongly drawn female protagonists. She travels widely to research her novels in great depth, and her ability to capture place and era has consistently met with positive critical review. Amnesty International UK has chosen The Moonlit Cage as one of the "Ten Great Books on Human Rights", along with To Kill a Mockingbird, 1984, The Help, and Mosquito.

Her young adult body of work consists of a collection of short stories, Saying Good-Bye, which was re-released as Toxic Love, and four novels: Promise Song, Mercy's Birds, Raspberry House Blues, and Search of the Moon King's Daughter. She has also written a first-chapter book for younger readers, Frankie on the Run. Linda has been the recipient of numerous awards, honours and nominations for her young adult work.

As well as being published in many journals and periodicals, Holeman's short stories have been widely anthologized in Canada – most noticeably in The Journey Prize Anthology  – and abroad. She was twice short-listed for the CBC Literary Competition, and won the Larry Turner Award for Non-Fiction, the Canadian Author/Winnipeg Free Press Non-Fiction Competition, and the Canadian Living Magazine National Writing Competition.

Linda acted as guest editor for a young adult issue of Prairie Fire Magazine, for which she was awarded the Vicky Metcalf Short Story Editor Award. She has been a member of the Manitoba Artists in the Schools Program and CANSCAIP, toured with the Canadian Children's Book Centre, acted as a mentor in the Manitoba Writers' Guild Mentor Program, and taught creative writing through the University of Winnipeg's Continuing Education Programme. She has served on a number of juries across Canada, including the Governor-General's Award for Children's Literature, and created and facilitated writing workshops on many aspects of the writing process to both students and adults nationally and internationally. She held a nine-month term as Writer-in-Residence at the Millennium Library in Winnipeg, and served on the editorial advisory board for Turnstone Press and on the board of the Manitoba Writers' Guild. She is a member of the Writers' Union of Canada.

Bibliography 
Holeman, Linda. Saying Good-Bye. Toronto, ON: Lester Publishing (1995). 
Republished as Toxic Love. Toronto, ON: Tundra Books (2003). 
Holeman, Linda. Frankie on the Run. Toronto, ON: Boardwalk Books (1995). 
Holeman, Linda. Flying to Yellow. Winnipeg, MB: Turnstone Press (1996). 
Holeman, Linda. Promise Song. Toronto, ON: Tundra Books (1997). 
Holeman, Linda. Mercy's Birds. Toronto, ON: Tundra Books (1998). 
Holeman, Linda. Devil's Darning Needle. Erin, ON: The Porcupine's Quill (1999). 
Holeman, Linda. Raspberry House Blues. Toronto, ON: Tundra Books (2000). 
Holeman, Linda. Search of the Moon King's Daughter. Toronto, ON: Tundra Books (2002). 
Holeman, Linda. The Linnet Bird. London, England: Headline Publishers (2004). 
Holeman, Linda. The Moonlit Cage. London, England: Headline Publishers (2006). 
Holeman, Linda. In a Far Country. London, England: Headline Publishers (2008). 
Holeman, Linda. The Saffron Gate. London, England: Headline Publishers (2009). 
Holeman, Linda. The Lost Souls of Angelkov. Toronto, ON: Random House Canada (2012). 
Holeman, Linda. The Devil On Her Tongue. Toronto, ON: Random House Canada (2014).

References

Sources
 The 49th Shelf: Beyond Borders: Linda Holeman on Travel and Writing. Kerry Clare, August 8, 2012
 
 Open Book Toronto: On Writing, with Linda Holeman. August 7, 2012
 
 Justine's Bookend Review, Justine Lewkowicz, August 3, 2012
 
 Winnipeg Free Press: Holeman Captivates with Russian Tale. Jennifer Ryan, July 7, 2012
 
 Globe and Mail: Serfs Up: A Novel of Angst in 19th Century Russia. Candace Fertile, July 24, 2012
 
 Winnipeg Free Press: Holeman's Female Protagonists Take Time Growing Into Roles. Carolin Vesely, July 26, 2012

External links 
 
 

Year of birth missing (living people)
Living people
University of Winnipeg alumni
University of Manitoba alumni
Canadian women novelists
Canadian historical novelists
Canadian women short story writers
Writers from Winnipeg
20th-century Canadian novelists
21st-century Canadian novelists
20th-century Canadian women writers
21st-century Canadian women writers
20th-century Canadian short story writers
21st-century Canadian short story writers
Women historical novelists